Henry James Luck (28 October 1876 – 8 October 1923) was an  Australian rules footballer who played with St Kilda in the Victorian Football League (VFL).

References

External links 

1876 births
1923 deaths
Australian rules footballers from Tasmania
St Kilda Football Club players
Launceston Football Club players